Hector A. Luisi  (September 19, 1919 – August 5, 2013) was a Uruguayan politician. He was the Foreign Minister (1967-1968) and the Ambassador of Uruguay to the United States (1985-1990).

Luisi died at the age of 94 on August 5, 2013. His death was caused by spinal stenosis and hypertension.

References

1919 births
2013 deaths
Uruguayan politicians
Foreign ministers of Uruguay
Ambassadors of Uruguay to the United States
Permanent Representatives of Uruguay to the United Nations
Officers of the Order of the British Empire